Fytche is an ancient surname derived from Fitch.  Notable people with the surname include:

Albert Fytche (1820–1892), Chief Commissioner of Burma
Elizabeth Fytche (1781–1865), mother of Alfred Tennyson, 1st Baron Tennyson 
Frances Elizabeth Disney Fytche, Essex-born heiress, wife of William Hillary
Lewis Disney Fytche (1738–1822), English landowner, originally Lewis Disney, father of Frances Elizabeth Disney Fytche
Stephen Fytche (1734–1799), vicar of Louth (1764) and rector of Withcall (1780), grandfather of Alfred Tennyson, 1st Baron Tennyson 
William Fytche (1716–1753), 1752 Governor of Bengal 
William Fytche (MP) (1671–1728), Member of Parliament from Maldon
stagename of Tammy Lynn Sytch (born 1972)

Baronetcy in the Baronetage of England

Other
 Fytche v. Wincanton Logistics Plc [2004] UKHL 31 House of Lords case 
Flintham Hall has been successively the seat of the Husseys, Hackers, Woodhouses, Disneys, Fytches and Thorotons
Dendrobium fytchianum: Fytch's Dendrobium

See also
Fitch (surname)